The Royal Society of Queensland was formed in Queensland, Australia in 1884 from the Queensland Philosophical Society, Queensland's oldest scientific institution, with royal patronage granted in 1885.

The aim of the Society is "Progressing science in Queensland". "Science" is interpreted broadly and includes a wide range of learned disciplines that follow scientific method. The Society is a non-partisan, secular, learned society, not an activist lobby group and does not campaign on environmental or planning issues. The Society supports science and scientific endeavour through publication of scientific research, public seminars and other events and maintenance of a substantial scientific library.

The Society is a custodian of scientific tradition and aims to counter the ill-effects of over-specialisation in the academy and shallowness in public debate. Networking between scientists, government, business and the community is a primary activity.

Membership is open to any person interested in the progress of science in Queensland. Although the membership includes a number of eminent and widely respected scientists and public intellectuals, the Society is neither elitist nor exclusive.

The Society hosts a Research Fund, established to sponsor research projects that escape the attention of the mainstream grant programs (such as those of the Australian Research Council). Donations are tax deductible under Australian taxation law.

In 2018 the Society established the Queensland Science Network as an unincorporated collaboration between more than 20 Queensland-focused community-based scientific and naturalists' organisations.

In 2019, the Society, along with co-organisers AgForce (peak body for broadacre agriculture) and NRM Regions Queensland (peak body for the regional natural resource management groups), organised a two-day Dialogue to examine how to transition the broadacre pastoral country (two-thirds of Queensland's area) to sustainability. The Dialogue produced a consensus Rangelands Declaration and a shared commitment to engage in further regional consultations and policy analysis.

The records of the Society, including the digitised Minute Books, are held by the State Library of Queensland.

Presidents

See also

 Proceedings of the Royal Society of Queensland

References

External links

Royal Society of Queensland Records 1889-2008. State Library of Queensland

 
1884 establishments in Australia
Organizations established in 1884
Science and technology in Queensland
History of science and technology in Australia
Learned societies of Australia